Jorge Gardea-Torresdey is a Mexican-American chemist and academic. He is the Dudley Professor of Chemistry and Environmental Science and Engineering at the University of Texas at El Paso (UTEP). In 2002, he led a team that discovered the ability of alfalfa to take up gold from soil and to store it in the form of nanoparticles.

Biography
Gardea-Torresdey grew up in Parral, a mining area in Northern Mexico. He went back and forth to the United States as a child, where his parents were in school at the University of Southern California. He was raised in an upper-class family, and he had nine siblings, all of whom were younger. From an early age, Gardea-Torresdey was interested in chemistry, to the disappointment of his family of entrepreneurs. He obtained a doctorate at New Mexico State University, where he studied under Joseph Wang.

Gardea-Torresdey joined the UTEP faculty in 1994 and became the chemistry department head in 2003. His work focuses on the use of nanoparticles. In 2002, Gardea-Torresdey led a team from UTEP and Mexico using technology at the Stanford Synchrotron Radiation Lightsource (SSRL) to study phytoremediation in alfalfa plants. The team demonstrated that alfalfa would extract gold from the medium in which it was growing and that it would store the gold in the form of nanoparticles. Gardea-Torresdey estimated that, after some refinement, the process could harvest gold amounting to about 20 percent of the weight of the plant.

He received the 2009 Distinguished Scientist Award from the Society for Advancement of Chicanos/Hispanics and Native Americans in Science (SACNAS). He was named a Minnie Stevens Piper Professor in 2012, one of ten in Texas that year, in recognition of his research and classroom accomplishments.

References

External links
Jorge Gardea-Torresdey on Google Scholar

Living people
21st-century American chemists
New Mexico State University alumni
University of Texas at El Paso faculty
People from Parral, Chihuahua
American academics of Mexican descent
Year of birth missing (living people)